Gilles Simon (born 14 June 1958 in Oujda, Morocco) is a French Formula One engineer and designer.

Career
Simon studied at the École des Mines, one of France's top engineering schools.  He graduated in 1984 and joined the Renault team, where he worked in R&D for four years.  He was then hired by Peugeot and worked on the marque's V10 engine, which would ultimately achieve success in their Le Mans effort in the early 1990s.

In 1993, Simon followed compatriot Jean Todt to Ferrari, assisting Paolo Martinelli in the Engine and Electronics Department.  Following the Italian's move to an executive role within Fiat, Simon took over as head of the department in October 2006. Simon left his position in October 2009, and was replaced by Luca Marmorini.

In December 2009, FIA President Jean Todt revealed that Simon is to join a working group to investigate new energies and environmentally friendly technology in motorsport.

In 2013 Simon was hired as a consultant by Honda to work on their Formula One engine. He parted company with the Japanese marque in 2017.

References
Who is Gilles Simon? Grandprix.com article, retrieved October 28, 2006.

1958 births
Living people
Formula One engine engineers
Ferrari people
Honda people
French motorsport people
People from Oujda